Scrobipalpa disjectella is a moth in the family Gelechiidae. It was described by Staudinger in 1859. It is found in Algeria, Spain and Kyrgyzstan.

The forewings are whitish-grey with a broad dark longitudinal shade, with an ochreous-yellow base. There are also two black stripes and a dark dot at the tip.

The larvae feed on Artemisia barrelieri.

References

Scrobipalpa
Moths described in 1859